The 1922–23 Northern Football League season was the 30th in the history of the Northern Football League, a football competition in Northern England.

Clubs

The league featured 13 clubs which competed in the last season, along with one new club:
 Loftus Albion

League table

References

1922-23
1922–23 in English football leagues